Iphiculidae is a family of crustaceans belonging to the order Decapoda.

Genera:
 Iphiculus Adams & White, 1849
 Pariphiculus Alcock, 1896

References

Decapods
Decapod families